Srikantabati P.S.S. Sikshaniketan (H.S.) is a co-ed high school located in Raghunathganj, Srikantabati, Murshidabad District, in the state of West Bengal, India.

Organisation 
Srikantabati P.S.S. Sikshaniketan (Higher Secondary) was founded in 1962.

The school is affiliated to the West Bengal Board of Secondary Education. The medium of instruction is Bengali.

Higher Secondary
 Science
 Arts

Vocational
 Computer Assembly and Maintenance

References

High schools and secondary schools in West Bengal
Schools in Murshidabad district
Educational institutions established in 1962
1962 establishments in West Bengal